The 2003 ECB National League season was a 45 over English county cricket competition; colloquially known as the Sunday League. Surrey Lions won the League for the second time.

Final standings

Division One

Division two

References 

Pro40